Quiksilver Pro Gold Coast was a surfing competition in the World Surf League that was held at Coolangatta in Queensland, Australia. In August 2021 it was announced that this event would be canceled.

Results

See also
 Roxy Pro Gold Coast
 Quiksilver Pro France
 Quiksilver
 Roxy

References

External links
 

World Surf League
Surfing competitions in Australia
Sport on the Gold Coast, Queensland
Recurring sporting events established in 2002
Coolangatta